The Hills of Donegal is a 1947 British drama film directed by John Argyle and starring Dinah Sheridan, James Etherington and Moore Marriott. It follows a young Irish woman who abandons a promising career as singer to get married, only to discover that her husband is not the man she thought he was.

Cast
  Dinah Sheridan  ...  Eileen Hannay
  James Etherington ...  Michael O'Keefe
  Moore Marriott ...  Old Jake
  John Bentley ...  Terry O'Keefe
  Brendan Clegg ...  Paddy Hannay
  Irene Handl ...  Mrs. Mactavish
  Tamara Desni ...  Carole Wells
  Maire O'Neill ...  Hannah
  Robert Arden ...  Daniel

References

External links

1947 films
1947 drama films
British drama films
County Donegal in fiction
Films produced by Ernest G. Roy
1940s English-language films
1940s British films